Mosaic is a 2007 American animated superhero film about a new character created by Stan Lee. It features the voice of Anna Paquin as Maggie Nelson and with supporting roles done by Kirby Morrow, Cam Clarke, Garry Chalk, Ron Halder, and Nicole Oliver. It was released under the Stan Lee Presents banner, which is a series of direct-to-DVD animated films distributed by POW! Entertainment with Anchor Bay Entertainment. The story was by Stan Lee, with the script by former X-Men writer Scott Lobdell.

Mosaic was released on DVD on  January 9, 2007, and had its television premiere on March 10, 2007 on Cartoon Network.

Plot
Aspiring young actress Maggie Nelson (Anna Paquin), who lives in New York City with her father, an Interpol agent, gains chameleon-like powers one night after she gets unknowingly caught between a severe electrical storm and a magic rune her father had brought home to study after it was found at the scene of a murder at a New York City museum. Her powers are from a secret and ancient race known as the Chameliel, who are able to hide in plain sight due to their shape shifting abilities, and she is told all about the Chameliel after meeting a young Chameliel named Mosaic (Kirby Morrow). The murder victim at the museum was a Chameliel who was killed by another Chameliel named Maniken, who is stealing some of the powerful Chameliel stones hidden around the world to use them to gain the alchemical powers of his dead wife Facade, and ruling the world. After Maniken kidnaps her father, Maggie becomes determined to help Mosaic to fight Maniken.

The two go from New York City, to the catacombs of Rome, to a large radio dish at the north magnetic pole, trying to stop Maniken, as he plans to sacrifice Maggie's father as part of a ceremony to use the Chameliel stones to transfer to Maniken the powers of his wife from her body and rule the Earth like a god. As Maniken prepares to begin the ceremony on the radio dish, Maggie uses her shape-shifting abilities with her acting skills to fool Maniken into believing she is his dead wife come back to life, to distract him from noticing Mosaic is planting explosives that destroy everything on the radio dish and render the ceremony impossible, and getting her father to safety. During the battle against Maniken, it is revealed that Mosaic is Maniken and Facade's son who volunteered to the rest of the Chameliel to go after his father and stop him. Maniken is defeated when Mosaic willingly sends both of them tumbling into an icy gorge, sacrificing himself to stop his father forever. Maggie then sneaks onto the Interpol copter her father is taken aboard, where she overhears him vowing to destroy all Chameliel.

Upon returning home, she plans to continue acting and agrees to her father's request to continue her studies, but at the same time, acknowledging her powers as the piece of the rest of the Chameliel within her, she vows to search for the remaining Chameliel stones and use their power for good, and honor Mosaic and the rest of the Chameliel by becoming the new Mosaic.

Cast
 Anna Paquin as Maggie Nelson/Mosaic
 Kirby Morrow as Morrow (Mosaic)
 Kathleen Barr as Facade and Mrs. Nottenmyer
 Garry Chalk as Nathan Nelson
 Cam Clarke as Stephan
 Ron Halder as Manikin and an Italian captain
 Stan Lee as Stanley the security guard
 Scott McNeil as Mr. Bullwraith and a landlord
 Nicole Oliver as Agent Newell
 Jim Ward as a tour guide and a belligerent detective

Maggie's powers
Maggie's powers include shapeshifting, superhuman strength, the ability to cling to surfaces allowing for scaling walls and ceilings (much like Spider-Man), seeing the DNA of other creatures (which is how she can compare humans to apes), regeneration, infrared vision, camouflage, invisibility and the ability to mimic voices as well as a gift for understanding the Chameliel language (it is never explained if this ability shows that she can understand other languages or speak them but it makes sense). Strangely, when Maggie becomes invisible, her outline gives off the appearance that she is completely naked, even though she is in fact wearing clothes. Why her clothes are not outlined when her body is invisible is never made clear.

Reception

References

External links
 
 
 Mosaic at Rotten Tomatoes

2007 films
2007 animated films
2000s animated superhero films
American children's animated science fiction films
American children's animated superhero films
Film superheroes
Films with screenplays by Stan Lee
2000s American animated films
Films about invisibility
Toonami
Films about shapeshifting
Films directed by Roy Allen Smith
Films set in New York City
Films set in Rome
Films set in the Arctic
Films about actors
2000s English-language films